Tall Qaleh-ye Pain (also Romanized as Tall-e Qal’eh-ye Pāīn and Tal Qal‘eh-ye Pā’īn) is a village in Tarom Rural District, in the Central District of Hajjiabad County, Hormozgan Province, Iran. At the 2006 census, its population was 288, in 67 families.

References 

Populated places in Hajjiabad County